The following lists the top 25 albums of 2013  in Australia from the Australian Recording Industry Association (ARIA) end-of-year albums chart.

Pink's album The Truth About Love was the most popular album for Australian music buyers for the second year in a row. Pink is the first artist to achieve this feat. In addition to that achievement, Pink has now had an album placed at number one or two in the ARIA End of Year Albums Chart for six out of the past seven years.

Top 25

See also 
 List of number-one albums of 2013 (Australia)
 List of Top 25 singles for 2013 in Australia

References

Australian record charts
2013 in Australian music
Australia Top 25 Albums